Norm Lewis (born June 2, 1963) is an American actor and singer. He has appeared in Europe, on Broadway, in film, television, recordings and regional theatre. Productions that he has been involved in include Dessa Rose, Miss Saigon, The Wild Party, Les Misérables, The Little Mermaid, and several others.

Lewis was the second African-American actor after Robert Guillaume to perform in the title role in Broadway's long-running production, The Phantom of the Opera.

Early life
Lewis was born in Tallahassee, Florida and grew up in Eatonville, Florida. He graduated in 1981 from Edgewater High School, Orlando. He worked at the Orlando Sentinel prior to his acting career.

Career
Lewis credits the kickoff of his career to Ralph Petillo, who ran Theatre on Park in Winter Park, Florida.

Lewis was featured as Agwe in the Gateway Playhouse (Bellport, New York) production of Once on This Island in 1992.

Lewis made his Broadway debut in The Who's Tommy (1993).
He was a replacement in Miss Saigon as John. In 1997 he played Jake in Side Show. He also appeared in Michael John LaChiusa's Broadway musical The Wild Party as Eddie. Lewis was in Michel Legrand's short-lived musical Amour in 2002, which also featured Melissa Errico, Malcolm Gets, and Lewis Cleale. He played the racketeer Eddie Satin in the New York City Center Encores! staged concert of Golden Boy in March 2002. He played Billy Flynn in the Broadway revival of Chicago in February 2004 and March 2004. He performed in several benefit concerts, including Dreamgirls (2001), Chess (2003), and Hair.

In 2005, Lewis starred in the Public Theater's Shakespeare in the Park revival of a musical version of Two Gentlemen of Verona. He played the role of Nathan in the Lincoln Center 2005 production of Dessa Rose.

Lewis has played Javert in the musical Les Misérables several times. He first starred in the role in the 2006 Broadway revival, making him the first African American actor to play the role in a professional English production. He later reprised it in the West End production. At London's O2 Arena, he sang the role in the 25th anniversary concert of the show. Lewis again reprised the role in The Muny, St. Louis production from July 15–21, 2013.

In 2007 he originated the role of King Triton in the Broadway production of The Little Mermaid. He went on to sing as King Triton on the original Broadway cast recording.

In regional theatre, he played the title role in Sweeney Todd, the musical by Stephen Sondheim and Hugh Wheeler, at the Casa Mañana Theatre, Fort Worth, Texas, beginning November 10, 2009. He had previously played this role at the Signature Theatre in 1999.

Lewis was featured in the musical revue Sondheim on Sondheim, which premiered in the Roundabout Theatre's Studio 54 in 2010. The production, conceived and directed by James Lapine, also featured Barbara Cook and Vanessa L. Williams. His rendition of "Being Alive" was one of the evening's outstanding highlights.

Lewis appeared in a revised version of Porgy and Bess, as Porgy, first at the Loeb Drama Center (Cambridge, Massachusetts) in August through September 2011 and then on Broadway at the Richard Rodgers Theatre starting in previews on December 12, 2011. This American Repertory Theater production was "re-imagined by Suzan-Lori Parks and Diedre Murray as a musical for contemporary audiences." He was nominated for the Tony Award for Best Actor in a Musical and the Drama Desk Award for Outstanding Actor in a Musical for his performance.

Lewis released his first solo album, This Is the Life! in 2008 under the Seahorse Productions label. His other notable recordings include the cast recordings of Side Show, The Who's Tommy, and the 1998 cast recording of A New Brain as Roger Delli-Bovi, for Scott Alan's Keys and for the 2001 New York cast recording of Elegies for Angels, Punks and Raging Queens in aid of the Momentum Aids Project.

In 2012, Lewis joined the cast of the ABC political thriller television series Scandal, in the role of Senator Edison Davis.

In 2013, Lewis starred as Prospero in the Public Theater's PublicWorks Shakespeare in the Park production of The Tempest at the Delacorte Theater. He was one of five professional actors heading a cast of 200 community participants.

He is an investor in the company Lolly Clothing, which was created by his good friend and fellow Broadway actor Chad Kimball.

He appeared in the Stephen Sondheim-Wynton Marsalis staged concert for Encores! titled A Bed and a Chair: A New York Love Affair, at New York City Center, from November 13 to November 17, 2013. The concert was directed by John Doyle and also featured Bernadette Peters, Jeremy Jordan, and Cyrille Aimée.

2014–present

On May 12, 2014, Lewis assumed the role of the titular Phantom in The Phantom of the Opera on Broadway. This made him the first black actor to play the role on Broadway and the third worldwide. He succeeded Hugh Panaro and joined fellow returning cast member Sierra Boggess, who returned as Christine on the same date. On February 7, 2015, Lewis ended his tenure as the Phantom with a performance at the Majestic Theatre. Coverage in Playbill credited him for his "impressive Broadway resumé". Being succeeded by actor James Barbour, Lewis remarked that he had been a fan of the musical for many years and felt that obtaining the part finally had been akin to winning the lottery.

Lewis is a recipient of the 2014 AUDELCO Special Achievement Award.

In 2016, Lewis reprised his role of King Triton for a live Hollywood Bowl concert production of The Little Mermaid. He also began playing Agwe in Once on this Island on January 8, 2018, at the Circle in the Square Theatre and continues to perform the role.

Lewis portrayed Caiaphas in the live televised concert production of Jesus Christ Superstar on April 1, 2018, Easter Sunday.

Theatre credits

Sources: Lortel.org; PlayBillVault

Discography
This Is the Life!, 2008
The Norm Lewis Christmas Album, 2018

Concerts
Lewis has performed at numerous venues, including Lincoln Center (where his concert was filmed for the TV special Norm Lewis: Who Am I?), Joe's Pub, Apollo Theater, and the New Jersey Performing Arts Center.

Film credits

Television credits

Awards and nominations

See also
This Is the Life!

References

External links
 www.normlewis.com
 
 

20th-century African-American male singers
21st-century African-American people
21st-century American male actors
1963 births
African-American male actors
American male musical theatre actors
American male stage actors
Edgewater High School alumni
Living people
Male actors from Tallahassee, Florida
Orlando Sentinel people
People from Eatonville, Florida